Plucheeae, sometimes also spelt as Plucheae, is a tribe of flowering plants in the subfamily Asteroideae.

Genera
This tribe was created by A. Anderberg (1989) following his reclassification of the Inuleae (Cass.) tribe.
It includes the following genera:
Cylindrocline
Pluchea
Porphyrostemma
Pterocaulon
Rhodogeron
Sachsia
Sphaeranthus
Streptoglossa

Anderberg's molecular data from 2005 does not support the monophyly of a tribe defined in this way. His 2005 classification does not recognize Plucheeae, but includes it in the Inuleae. This classification does include a subtribe Plucheinae in the Inuleae, but this subtribe contains a number of species from the former Inuleae as well as all the species which had been in Plucheeae.

Bibliography
Anderberg, A. A. 1989: Phylogeny and reclassification of the tribe Inuleae (Asteraceae). − Can. J. Bot. 67: 2277−2296.
— 1991: Taxonomy and phylogeny of the tribe Plucheae. – Pl. Syst. Evol. 176: 145−177.

References

External links
The Pluchea tetranthera complex (Compositae, Plucheeae) from Australia 

Asteroideae
Asteraceae tribes
Historically recognized angiosperm taxa